Uttaran is an Indian soap opera that aired on Colors TV from 1 December 2008 to 16 January 2015. The third longest-running Indian television series of Colors TV, it starred Tina Datta, Rashami Desai, Nandish Sandhu, Rohit Khurana, Sreejita De and Mrunal Jain.

Plot
Set in Mumbai, Ichha is the daughter of a poor widow Damini, who begins working at Jogi Thakur Mansion as a maid. Jogi's daughter Tapasya befriends Ichha and they share a sister-like bond. Sumitra influences Tapasya to see Ichha differently. Tapasya hits jealous when Divya and Jogi care for Ichha as their child, unaware that Jogi was responsible for Ichha's father Rajendra's death.

10 years later

Tapasya is a rich spoilt brat. Simple, Ichha wants to open a school to give free education to poor kids. She meets a very Kindhearted man, Veer and they both fall in love. Their families agree to their relation and they're about to marry. Insecure seeing Veer shower Ichha with expensive gifts, Tapasya does a suicide drama and begs Ichha to let her marry Veer. Ichha agrees and Veer marries Tapasya. His brother Vansh, a drug addict falls for Ichha looking at her caring nature.

Veer, unaware of Vansh's love, tries to divorce Tapasya and marry Ichha. Tapasya manipulates Gunvanti who gets Vansh and Ichha married. Veer is heartbroken. Tapasya misleads Vansh, indirectly blaming him for Ichha's sufferings. As a result, he kills himself. Gunvanti blames Ichha. Veer finds out and exposes how Tapasya tried to kill Ichha and made Vansh commit suicide. Shocked, Jogi disowns her. Ichha goes to Vrindavan. There, Veer arrives to unite with her.

They express their love and marry in Vrindavan; the family accepts them. Tapasya meets a Ruthless, Raghuvendra Rathore, who falls for her, but she betrays him in game of poker. He leaves her due to her disloyalty. Pregnant with his baby, she returns to Veer's family and delivers Mukta, whom she unintentionally abandons. Veer and Ichha raise her, unaware she is Tapasya's daughter. Ichha delivers a boy but Sumitra and Pushkar steal him.

They bribe the nurse to tell Ichha, the boy was stillborn. Raghuvendra bumps into and takes the baby from Pushkar. He and Tapasya adopt the baby, named Yuvraj. Pregnant again, Ichha saves Veer from the cruel Avinash, who attacks him. Veer loses his memory. Ichha kills Avinash and is jailed for 18 years. Ichha delivers a girl in prison, and tells Damini to raise the baby, named Meethi.

18 years later

Meethi and Mukta are best friends just like their mothers. Ichha returns. Arrogant and selfish, Yuvraj hates her. Meethi also presumed her dead. Kanha, whom Damini raised is a successful CEO, happily married to Surbhi. Yuvraj and Meethi were brought up by Gunvanti and Damini respectively, and Gunvanti brainwashed him against Ichha. Sumitra reveals to Meethi that Ichha is alive, but lies she ruined Tapasya's life since childhood. Earlier, Meethi is in denial.

But when she knows Ichha was in prison for murder, she develops a negative opinion to her. Kanha also reveals Ichha was in prison for murder, but fails to mention she killed Avinash to save Veer. Meethi confronts and rejects Ichha. Damini and Kanha try to convince her to forgive Ichha. Meethi disbelieves them. Damini's attempt to unite them fails as Meethi hates Ichha even more. Sumitra brainwashes Mukta, who gets close to Yuvraj.

Later, he tries to rape Mukta but Ichha saves her. Mukta realises she misunderstood her and Meethi. Yuvraj is arrested, and finds out Ichha is his mother. His hatred for her further intensifies as she testifies against him in court, and he is incarcerated for 5 years. Veer who has still no memories, lives with Gunvanti and Amla. Reformed after living in US from years, Tapasya restores his memory. Vishnu encourages Meethi, who finally accepts Ichha.

Eventually, Veer and Ichha unite. Meethi marries Vishnu on Ichha's arrangement. He is actually Avinash's son, Akash, who wants revenge. Mukta discovers his truth and tries to locate the real Vishnu, a humble blue-collar worker for an NGO, to expose Akash. He orders his goons to kidnap and kill Mukta. Fortunately, Raghuvendra saves her. At Akash and Meethi's wedding, Mukta tries to expose him but no one except Sumitra believes her.

Meanwhile, Ichha and Tapasya risk their life to save Mukta from Veer's uncle Tej, who shoots Tapasya. Fatally, Ichha gets hit by a truck and donates her heart to Tapasya before dying. Tapasya now cares for Meethi just like Mukta. Later, Raghuvendra gets the evidence to expose Akash. Surbhi turns out as Akash's maternal cousin. His mom, Ekadashi orders him to kill Meethi but he falls in love with her. Meethi leaves the house. Tapasya throws the pregnant Surbhi out.

Surbhi repents for her actions, and dies after delivering Ajitesh. Kanha forgives her and promises to raise Ajitesh. As Vishnu and Mukta love each other, they marry and soon have a son, Manav. Meethi and Akash unite. She is accepted by his family. After undergoing a plastic surgery, Yuvraj returns as Mukta's boss for revenge. He kidnaps her. While saving her, a pregnant Meethi miscarries and disowns Yuvraj before Ekadashi banishes her. She travels to Srinagar.

Caught up in a terrorist attack by Asgar, Meethi slips into a river and is transported by the current across the border to Gilgit. Aashfaq saves her; he falls in love with and helps her in returning to India. He bids her a tearful goodbye. Akash and Meethi unite. She adopts Rani as Nandini is imprisoned because she saved Akash from and murdered his old enemy. Meethi and Akash also adopt Tamanna, whom Rani hates. Sumitra reforms.

Eventually, Sumitra and Damini convince Mukta and Meethi to unite, and in the end, reflect the everlasting friendship of Ichha and Tapasya.

Cast

Main
Tina Datta as
 Ichcha Bundela: Damini and Rajendra's daughter; Jogi's adopted daughter; Vansh's widow; Veer's wife; Yuvraj and Meethi's mother (2009–13)
 Sparsh Khanchandani as Child Ichcha Bharti (2008–09)
 Meethi Bundela Chatterjee: Ichcha and Veer's daughter; Yuvraj and Kanha's sister; Akash's wife; Rani and Tamanna's adoptive mother (2012–15)
 Rashami Desai as Tapasya Thakur Rathore: Divya and Jogi's daughter; Raghuvendra's wife; Veer and Tej's ex-wife; Mukta's mother, Manav's grandmother (2009–14)
Ishita Panchal as Child Tapasya Thakur (2008–09)
Nandish Sandhu / Vikas Bhalla as Veer Singh Bundela – Umed and Gunwanti's younger son; Vansh's brother; Tapasya ex-husband; Ichcha's husband; Yuvraj and Meethi's father (2009–13)
Rohit Khurana as
Vansh Singh Bundela – Umed and Gunwanti's elder son; Veer's brother; Ichcha's ex-husband (2009–10) (Dead)
Rocky Shah – Vansh's lookalike; Ruby's fiancé (2011–12)
 Sreejita De as Mukta Rathore Kashyap – Tapasya and Raghuvendra's daughter; Meethi's best friend; Vishnu's wife; Manav's mother (2012–15)  
Saurabh Jain / Bharat Chawda as Yuvraj Singh Bundela – Ichcha and Veer's son; Meethi and Kanha's brother (2012–14)
 Mrunal Jain as Akash Chatterjee – Avinash and Ekadashi's son; Sankrant's brother; Surbhi and Nirbhay's cousin; Nandini's ex-fiancé; Meethi's husband; Rani's father; Tamanna's adoptive father (2013–15)
 Ajay Chaudhary as Vishnu Kashyap – Mukta's husband; Manav's father (2013–15)

Recurring cast

 Vaishali Thakkar as Damini Bharti – Rajendra's widow; Ichcha's mother; Thakur family's maid; Yuvraj, Meethi and Kanha's grandmother (2008–15)
 Ayub Khan as Jogi Thakur – Divya's husband; Tapasya's father; Ichcha's adoptive father; Mukta's grandfather; Manav's great-grandfather (2008–14)
 Pratima Kazmi as Sumitra Devi Jaiswal – Tapasya's grandmother, Mukta's great-grandmother, Pushkar's mother; Divya's aunt (2008–15)
 Pragati Mehra / Pyumori Mehta Ghosh as Divya Thakur – Pushkar's cousin; Jogi's wife; Tapasya's mother; Mukta's grandmother; Manav's great-grandmother (2008–15)
 Akanksha Awasthi as Rohini Jaiswal – Pushkar's wife (2008–13)
 Arun Singh Sharma as Pushkar Jaiswal – Sumitra's son; Rohini's husband; Divya's cousin (2008–12)
 Shamim Sheikh as Baldev Singh Bundela – Umed and Tej's father; Vansh and Veer's grandfather (2009–13) (Dead)
 Akhil Mishra as Umed Singh Bundela – Baldev's son; Tej's half-brother; Gunvanti's husband; Vansh and Veer's father; Yuvraj and Meethi's grandfather (2009–13)
 Beena Banerjee as Gunvanti Bundela – Umed's wife; Vansh and Veer's mother; Yuvraj and Meethi's grandmother (2009–13)
 Monalika Bhonsle as Chanda Kumari Sachdev – Vansh and Veer's cousin; Gunvanti's niece (2009–13)
 Pawan Mahendru as Kasa Seth: Bundela family's maid (2009–14)
 Sunil Sinha/Kiran Karmarkar as Tej Singh Bundela: Baldev's son; Umed's half-brother; Tapasya's ex-husband (2009, 2012–13)
 Sunil Chauhan as Rajendra Bharti: Damini's husband; Ichha's father; Yuvraj and Meethi's grandfather (2009) (Dead)
 Sharhaan Singh as Siddharth Verma: Tapasya's ex-boyfriend (2009–12)
 Gaurav Chopra as Raghuvendra Pratap Rathore- Husband of Tapasya. Ex-husband of Malvika. Father of Mukta and Ambika  Manav's grandfather.
 Gaurav S Bajaj as Aman Verma: Meethi and Mukta's colleague and former love (2012)
 Chaitanya Choudhury as Kanha Chatterjee: Jignesh's son; Avinash's maternal nephew; Ichha and Veer's adopted son; Yuvraj and Meethi's adoptive brother; Surbhi's husband; Ajitesh's father (2012–14)
 Pranitaa Pandit as Surbhi Chatterjee: Agarth and Kadambari's daughter; Nirbhay's sister; Akash and Sankrant's cousin; Kanha's wife; Ajitesh's mother (2012–13) (Dead)
 Krutika Desai Khan as Ekadashi Chatterjee: Agarth, Gomati and Pavitra's brother; Avinash's wife; Akash and Sankrant's mother (2012–15)
 Varun Toorkey as Sankrant Chatterjee: Ekadashi and Avinash's son; Akash's brother; Surbhi and Nirbhay's cousin; Ambika's husband (2013–15)
 Vividha Kirti as Ambika Chatterjee: Malvika and Raghuvendra's daughter; Mukta's half-sister; Sankrant's wife (2013–15)
 Arishfa Khan as Rani Chatterjee: Akash and Nandini's daughter; Meethi's adopted daughter (2014–15)
 An unknown actress as Tamanna Chatterjee: Akash and Meethi's adopted daughter; Khanna's daughter (2015)
 Arti Singh as Kajri Yadav: Nirbhay's wife (2013–14)
 Rumi Khan as Nirbhay Yadav: Agarth and Kadambari's son; Surbhi's brother; Ekadashi, Gomati, and Pavitra's nephew; Kajri's husband (2013) (Dead)
 Girija Shankar as Agarth Yadav: Ekadashi, Gomati, and Pavitra's brother: Kadambari's husband; Nirbhay and Surbhi's father (2013)
 Kabbir as Rajju Yadav (2013–14)
 Neena Singh as Gomati Yadav (2013–15)
 Hetal Yadav as Pavitra Yadav (2013–14)
 Rishina Kandhari as Malavika Rathore/Mauli: Raghuvendra's ex-wife; Ambika's mother (2014–15)
 Sonica Handa as Amla Bundela: Veer's third wife (2012–13)
 Rajesh Khera as Maharani (2014)
 Tiku Talsania as Colonel Swarnik Agnihotri (2014)
 Krip Suri as Asgar Rizvi: Saba, Nusrat, and Ashfaque's brother; Zubieda and Fida's husband (2014)
 Gaurav Vasudev as Babar (2014)
 Sahil Phull as Ashfaque Rizvi: Saba, Nusrat and Asgar's brother (2014)
 Anchal Sabharwal as Fida: Asgar's second wife (2014)
 Shriya Jha as Nandini Sharma/Chameli: Akash's ex-girlfriend; Rani's mother; Sri Karna's daughter (2014–15)
 Madhura Naik as Nilofer Naaz: Ashfaque's wife; Khalid's sister (2014)
 Mansi Sharma as Saba Mehrami: Nusrat, Asgar and Ashfaque's sister (2014)
 Samikssha Batnagar as Zubieda Ahmed: Asgar's first wife (2014)
 Rakesh Pandey as Rizvi Gulzar: Saba, Nusrat, Asgar and Ashfaque's father; Mumtaz's husband (2014)
 Charu Rohatgi as Mumtaz Begum: Saba, Nusrat, Asgar and Ashfaque's mother; Rizvi's wife (2014)
 Amrin Chakkiwala as Nusrat Rizvi (2014)
 Vineett Kumar/Rrajvir Singh as Khalid: Saba's husband; Nilofer's brother (2014)
 An unknown actor as Mushtaq Ansari Sahab (2014)
 Farida Dadi as Anjum Jalalan (2008–14)
 Usha Bachani as Mrs. Jailaxmi Khurana (2009)
 Aastha Chaudhary as Madhuran Sethi (2011)
 Raj Singh Verma as Avinash Chatterjee: Ekadashi's husband; Akash and Sankrant's father; Prasad's son; Kanha's maternal uncle (2011–12)
 Sharad Kelkar as Satyaveer Singh (2011)
 An unknown actress as Kuki Arora (2009)
 An unknown actress as Jyoti Bhatia: Lali's sister; Thakur family's maid (2008–10)
 Shivshakti Sachdev as Lali Thakur: Jyoti's sister (2009)
 An unknown actor as Maharaj Karvansh: Thakur family's maid (2008–09)
 Priya Marathe as Ruby Shekhawat: Rocky's fiancée (2011–12)
 Harsha Khandeparkar as Sanchi Singh (2011)
 Apurva as Kinjal (2010)
 Nikita Sharma as Masoom (2010)
 Arun Bali as Godman (2014) 
 Vikas Sethi as Inspector Abeeran Mattoo (2010)
 Nikhil Arya as Inspector Suryakant Tarte (2011–12)

Production

Casting
The show initially starred Sparsh Khanchandani as young Ichcha with Ishita Panchal as young Tapasya in December 2008 to June 2009. 

It later took a generation leap and from June 2009 to March 2012, it focused on the characters of Ichcha, Tapasya, Veer and Vansh played by Tina Datta, Rashami Desai, Nandish Sandhu and Rohit Khurana respectively. Sandhu quit the show as he doesn't want to be the part of 18 years leap and was replaced by Vikas Bhalla in 2012.  Raj Singh Verma played Avinash as the key negative character.

Another 18-year leap was introduced in March 2012 and then the story centered around the life of Meethi, Mukta, Yuvraj, Akash and Vishnu portrayed by Tina Datta, Sreejita De, Saurabh Raj Jain, Mrunal Jain and Ajay Chaudhary until its end in January 2015. It has been dubbed in 20+ languages

Reception
Uttaran'''s premiere had a 3.25 target rating point (TRP) and it became one of the top-rated Hindi GEC, and the second most watched program of Colors TV after Balika Vadhu at the time. It was one of the show that helped Colors TV to briefly gain first position in Hindi GEC, breaking the nine-year run of Star Plus. Between 2008 to till first quarter of 2012, Uttaran maintained its top position mostly on the ratings charts.

In week 51 of 2008, it occupied fifth position with 3.84 TVR.

In week 2 of 2009, it occupied fourth position with 4.5 TVR. In week of 24 October 2009, it occupied top position and garnered 8.2 TVR. In week of 14 November 2009, it garnered its highest weekly rating of 9.6 TVR.

In week 3 of 2010, it occupied top position and garnered 8.1 TVR. In week of 17 July 2010, it garnered its highest weekly rating of 8.4 TVR. In week 46 of 2010, it occupied third position with 5.64 TVR.

For a record week of 44, it was the top 10 position in Hindi GEC throughout the year 2011 and In week 13 of 2011, it occupied top position with 5.9 TVR. In week 29 of 2011, it occupied fourth position with 5.04 TVR.

In week 7 of 2012, It occupied fifth position with 4.44 TVR.

The 18 years leap marked a series of disappointments for the show so as during the years of mid-2012 to 2015, Uttaran TRP ratings dropped significantly and eventually the serial ended on 16 January 2015 after airing for 6 years and was replaced by Code Red from 19 January 2015.

It has been dubbed in 20+ languages in 16+ countries

Awards
The series has won the following awards:
 

 Adaptations 

 References 

External linksUttaran'' on Voot

2008 Indian television series debuts
2015 Indian television series endings
Indian drama television series
Indian television soap operas
Colors TV original programming
Television shows set in Rajasthan